The Canadian federal budget for fiscal year 1988–1989 was presented to the House of Commons of Canada by finance minister Michael Wilson on 10 February 1988. It was the fourth budget after the 1984 Canadian federal election and would be the last before the 1988 Canadian federal election.

Taxes 
Michael Wilson presented an important reform of the tax system in June 1987. As a result, the budget 1988 did not bring forward important changes to the tax system with a few exceptions:
 Increase in Child Benefits: after the Minister of National Health and Welfare presented a new policy on child care, the budget provides for a doubling of deductible child care expenses (from $2,000 to $4,000 per year for each eligible child) and repealed the overall maximum deduction limit of $8,000 per year. The Refundable Child Tax Credit is increased by a supplement of $100 in the 1988 tax year and another $100 in the 1989 tax year for low and middle-income families. That supplement is however reduced by 25% of the aforementioned child care expenses deduction;
 National Labour-Sponsored Venture Capital Tax Credit: a new tax credit of 20% (max of $700 per year and per taxpayer) is provided for shares of Labour-Sponsored Venture Capital acquired in the 1988 tax year;
 Associated Corporations (Corporate income taxes): clarification of the definition of associated corporations to prevent multiple use of the small business deduction;<
 Increase in Excise Tax on Gasoline: excise taxes on gasoline and aviation gasoline is increased by 1¢ per litre. The measure was projected to yield $300 million in yearly revenues

Expenditures 
The budget provides for a reduction of $300 million in non-statutory spending for 1989–90 to keep the deficit in line with the projections made in the June 1987 White Paper on tax reform. These reductions do not affect social programs and transfers to provinces and explicitly excludes Official Development Assistance (i.e. international aid) and the Department of National Defence.

Reactions

Opposition 
Ed Broadbent, leader of the New Democratic Party joked that the budget was a gift for opposition parties. Him and John Turner, leader of the Opposition, strongly criticized the increase in gasoline excise tax and the general fiscal policy of the Mulroney government. The NPD leader decried a policy that only benefits high-earners and raises taxes for the middle class and joked that “the only good thing about this budget is that it's almost certain to be the last Conservative budget.”

Liberal's finance critic and Quebec lieutenant, Raymond Garneau blasted the budget as a “A Canada for the rich, but not a Canada for the average Canadian, not a Canada for the poor” pointing that Mr. Wilson increased taxes by $22 billion since 1984.

Provinces 
Quebec's finance minister, Gérard D. Levesque declared he was disappointed that the federal government did not reduce its deficit faster and added that deficit reduction should have been the priority of a budget that was more a track record than a budget. Lastly, the minister expressed his disappointment towards the lack of measures to help families or Quebec's economic development whereas Alberta, Northern Ontario and the Atlantic provinces benefited from significant measures.

Notes

References
 
 Budget Speech
 Budget Papers

1988 in Canadian law

Canadian budgets
1988 government budgets
1988 in Canadian politics